Helena Beata Maria af Sandeberg (Solna, 1 September 1971) is a Swedish actress.

Early life
Helena af Sandeberg was born on 1 September 1971 in Solna, Stockholm County, Sweden and grew up in Rotebro, Stockholm County, Sweden. She studied at Södra Latin in Stockholm and Actors Studio in New York. The af Sandeberg family is part of the Swedish untitled nobility.

Career

In 2013, af Sandberg hosted the Sommar i P1 on SR P1 and appeared on SVT's Sommarpratarna in October 2014.

Personal life
From 2005 to 2010, she was married to the director Alexander Mørk-Eidem with whom she had a son, Alfred. In 2013, she married the actor and musician Fredrik Lycke and in 2014 their daughter was born. They divorced in 2017. She owns the production company Alfredo Film och teater AB.

Selected filmography
1997 - Rederiet (TV)
1997 - 9 millimeter
1998 - Zingo
1999 - In Bed with Santa
1999 - Sjätte dagen (TV)
1999 - C/o Segemyhr (TV)
2002 - Heja Björn (TV)
2003 - Virus i paradiset (TV)
2003 - Tur & retur
2005 - Kim Novak badade aldrig i Genesarets sjö
2006 - Hombres (TV)
2008 - Oskyldigt dömd (TV)
2010 - Cornelis
2012 - The Hypnotist
2012 - Blondie
2019 – Quicksand (Netflix Series)
2021 –  Dough (TV)

References

External links

www.agentfirman.se

20th-century Swedish actresses
21st-century Swedish actresses
People from Solna Municipality
Living people
1971 births